Music from the Motion Picture Pulp Fiction is the soundtrack to Quentin Tarantino's 1994 film Pulp Fiction, released on September 27, 1994, by MCA Records. No traditional film score was commissioned for Pulp Fiction. The film contains a mix of American rock and roll, surf music, pop and soul. The soundtrack is equally untraditional, consisting of nine songs from the film, four tracks of dialogue snippets followed by a song, and three tracks of dialogue alone. Seven songs featured in the film were not included in the original 41-minute soundtrack.

The album reached  21 on the Billboard 200, while Urge Overkill's cover of the Neil Diamond song "Girl, You'll Be a Woman Soon" peaked at No. 59 on the Billboard Hot 100.

Composition
Tarantino used an eclectic assortment of songs by various artists. Notable songs include Dick Dale's now-iconic rendition of "Misirlou", which is played during the opening credits. Tarantino chose surf music for the basic score of the film because, "it just seems like rock 'n' roll Ennio Morricone music, rock 'n' roll spaghetti Western music."

Many of the songs on the soundtrack were suggested to Tarantino by musician Boyd Rice through their mutual friend Allison Anders, including Dick Dale's "Misirlou". Other songs were suggested to Tarantino by his friends Chuck Kelley and Laura Lovelace, who were credited as music consultants. Lovelace also appeared in the film as Laura the waitress.

In addition to the surf-rock rendition of "Misirlou", other notable songs include "Jungle Boogie" by Kool & the Gang, Dusty Springfield's version of "Son of a Preacher Man", "Flowers on the Wall" by the Statler Brothers and "Bustin' Surfboards" by The Tornadoes, from 1962, which had been one of the first instrumental surf songs to hit the United States music charts after notables such as "Walk--Don't Run" by the Ventures.

Excerpts of dialogue include Jules' "Ezekiel 25:17" speech and the "Royale with Cheese" exchange between Jules and Vincent.

A two-disc collector's edition of the album was issued in 2002—the first disc contained the songs, including four additional tracks; and the second disc was a spoken-word interview with Tarantino.

Woody Thorne's 1961 song "Teenagers in Love" and Link Wray's 1965 single "Rumble" are two of the three songs missing from the collector's edition soundtrack. The last song is unique to the film: it is Ricky Nelson's "Waitin' in School" as performed by actor Gary Shorelle, which plays as Vincent and Mia enter Jackrabbit Slim's.

Influence 
The soundtrack reached No. 21 on the Billboard 200, and at the time, was certified platinum by the Canadian Recording Industry Association (CRIA), denoting shipments in excess of 100,000 units in Canada. By September 1995, the album had sold over 1.6 million copies in the United States, and by April 1996, sales stood at two million units.

The soundtrack helped launch the band Urge Overkill, which covered Neil Diamond's "Girl, You'll Be a Woman Soon" (produced by Kramer) in 1993, into a mainstream market. Sony "received a nice sum" for "Son of a Preacher Man" and Kool & the Gang enjoyed a resurgence when "Jungle Boogie" was released on the soundtrack.

The Orange County Register described why the soundtrack of Pulp Fiction stood out from all the others: "Unlike so many soundtracks, which just seem to be repositories for stray songs by hit acts regardless of whether they fit the film's mood, Tarantino's use of music in Reservoir Dogs and Pulp Fiction exploded with a brash, Technicolor, pop-culture intensity that mirrored the stories he was telling." Karyn Rachtman was the music supervisor on both Reservoir Dogs and Pulp Fiction.

Analyzing the success of Tarantino's marketing, Billboard chalked up MCA's compilation to identifying the market niche: "Pulp Fiction ... successfully spoke to those attuned to the hip, stylized nature of those particular films." The eclectic "mix-and-match strategy" is true to the film.  "In some cases, like Pulp Fiction and Reservoir Dogs, which were not geared toward any specific demographic, the soundtracks were still very focused albums", said Kathy Nelson, senior VP/general manager at MCA Soundtracks. "In both cases, the body of work—both the music and the film—has a specific personality."

In 1997, Gary Thompson of The Philadelphia Inquirer said that Pulp Fiction "reinvigorated surf rock". That statement would be defining for Del-Fi Records, owned by legendary producer Bob Keane; the Pulp Fiction soundtrack contained two songs that were originally released on Del-Fi: Bullwinkle Pt II by the Centurians, and Surf Rider by The Lively Ones. Del-Fi Records released a compilation CD in 1995 entitled Pulp Surfin''' featuring songs by those bands plus sixteen other surf tracks from the vaults. The cover artwork was yet another parody of the Pulp Fiction film poster.

Inspired by the soundtrack, advertisers started to use surf music in their commercials "to help sell everything from burritos to toothpaste", making surf music hugely popular again.

More than two years after the film was released, the influence and monetary success was still being felt in the industry. "Mundane commercials using Dick Dale '60s surf licks, the kind made popular again by the Pulp Fiction'' soundtrack...following a trend—in this case, a two-year-old hit movie."

Track listing

Collector's edition
A collector's edition version of the soundtrack was released in 2002. It features remastered versions of the original sixteen tracks, along with five bonus tracks, including an interview with director Quentin Tarantino. There are single and two-disc releases of this version, with the track listings being identical; the two-disc version has the Tarantino interview on the second disc. The additional tracks are:

Songs not on the soundtrack releases
 "Waitin' in School" performed by Gary Shorelle (not commercially available)
 "Ace of Spades" performed by Link Wray and His Ray Men
 "Teenagers in Love" performed by Woody Thorne

Charts

Weekly charts

Year-end charts

Certifications

References

1994 soundtrack albums
Comedy-drama film soundtracks
Crime film soundtracks
MCA Records soundtracks
Pop soundtracks
Rock soundtracks
Soul soundtracks
Surf albums